Rissopsetia is a genus of sea snails, marine gastropod molluscs in the family Pyramidellidae.

Species
Species within the genus Rissopsetia include:
 Rissopsetia altispira Ponder, 1974 
 Rissopsetia attenuata Peñas & Rolán, 2017
 Rissopsetia basilica Peñas & Rolán, 2017
 Rissopsetia delicata Peñas & Rolán, 2017
 Rissopsetia elegans Peñas & Rolán, 2017
 Rissopsetia gavisa (Melvill, 1896)
 Rissopsetia gracilis (W. R. B. Oliver, 1915)
 Rissopsetia hummelincki Faber, 1984
 Rissopsetia islandica Warén, 1989
 Rissopsetia maccoyi (Tenison-Woods, 1876)
 Rissopsetia maoria Dell, 1956
 † Rissopsetia nukumaruensis (Laws, 1940) 
 Rissopsetia perstriata Peñas & Rolán, 2017
 Rissopsetia reticuli Peñas & Rolán, 2017
 Rissopsetia rogeri Peñas & Rolán, 2017
 Rissopsetia solomonensis Peñas & Rolán, 2017
 Rissopsetia spirarum Peñas & Rolán, 2017
 Rissopsetia ultima Peñas & Rolán, 2017
 Rissopsetia vanuatuensis Peñas & Rolán, 2017

References

 Dell R.K. (1956). Some new off-shore Mollusca from New Zealand. Records of the Dominion Museum, 3 (1) : 27-59.
 Ponder W. 1974. A review of the Australian species assigned to Rissopsis Garrett with a description of a new species of Rissopsetia (Mollusca: Gastropoda). Journal of the Malacological Society of Australia, 3: 25-35.
 Gofas, S.; Le Renard, J.; Bouchet, P. (2001). Mollusca, in: Costello, M.J. et al. (Ed.) (2001). European register of marine species: a check-list of the marine species in Europe and a bibliography of guides to their identification. Collection Patrimoines Naturels, 50: pp. 180–213
 Spencer, H.; Marshall. B. (2009). All Mollusca except Opisthobranchia. In: Gordon, D. (Ed.) (2009). New Zealand Inventory of Biodiversity. Volume One: Kingdom Animalia. 584 pp
 Peñas A. & Rolán E. (2017). Deep water Pyramidelloidea from the central and South Pacific. The tribe Chrysallidini. ECIMAT (Estación de Ciencias Mariñas de Toralla), Universidade de Vigo. 412 pp.

External links
 To ITIS
 To World Register of Marine Species

Cimidae